Indira Gandhi Sports Stadium is a main sports stadium in union territory of Puducherry in India. The stadium is basic sports facility in the city and has facilities of football and hockey playing field apart from the notable badminton court and volleyball game court as well as indoor stadium.

The stadium has hosted several state and national level sports events and tournaments. The stadium is owned and managed by Pondicherry State Sports Council.

See also 
 Puducherry
 Yanam
 YSR Indoor Stadium

References

Indoor arenas in India
Volleyball venues in India
Sports venues in Puducherry
Monuments and memorials to Indira Gandhi
Year of establishment missing